This is a list of events in Scottish television from 1970.

Events

18 June – Televised coverage of the 1970 United Kingdom general election.
13 November – The Colour Strike begins when ITV staff refuse to work with colour television equipment, following a dispute over pay with their management.
Unknown – The singer David Bowie appears in a half-hour mime improv play on Scottish Television. He narrates in song, while perched on a ladder.
Unknown – The first current affairs television series in Gaelic, begins broadcasting on BBC Scotland.

Television series
Scotsport (1957–2008)
Dr. Finlay's Casebook (1962–1971)
Reporting Scotland (1968–1983; 1984–present)

Ending this year
The Adventures of Francie and Josie (1962–1970)

Births
16 April - James Watson, actor
17 September - Dallas Campbell, television presenter
Unknown - Frances Grey, actress
Unknown - Matt Healy, actor
Unknown - Sarah Heaney, television presenter

See also
1970 in Scotland

References

 
Television in Scotland by year
1970s in Scottish television